The 2007 Grand Prix of Mosport presented by Mobil 1 was the ninth round of the 2007 American Le Mans Series season.  It took place at Mosport International Raceway, Canada on August 26, 2007.

Official results
Class winners in bold.  Cars failing to complete 70% of winner's distance marked as Not Classified (NC).

Statistics
 Pole Position - #1 Audi Sport North America - 1:05.829
 Fastest Lap - #2 Audi Sport North America - 1:06.371

References

External links
 2007 Grand Prix of Mosport Race Broadcast (American Le Mans Series YouTube Channel)

Mosport
Grand Prix of Mosport
Grand Prix of Mosport